is a 43 km long Japanese aqueduct located in Tokyo. It was constructed by the Tokugawa shogunate to supply drinking and fire-fighting water from the Tama river to Edo, providing irrigation water around farm villages. 

The aqueduct was made following a request for permission from the people of Kojimachi and Shibaguchi to build another aqueduct, drawing the waters of the Tama river. The government provided 7,500 ryō for the construction, 3,000 ryō were collected by public subscription. Construction on the 43 km long aqueduct, which runs from Hamura, Tokyo to Yotsuya, Tokyo, began in April 1653. The project was undertaken by the Seiemon brothers who were awarded the surname "Tamagawa" in honour of their accomplishment. Prior to the construction, the two brothers were considered "mere peasants". Before the construction of the aqueduct the city was served by a single, and insufficient, Kanda Aqueduct.

In 1948, Osamu Dazai, considered  one of the foremost fiction writers of 20th-century Japan, and his mistress Tomie Yamazaki, drowned themselves in the aqueduct together. Dazai had been living in Mitaka, Tokyo, through which the aqueduct runs, since 1939.

References

External links
Tamagawa Jōsui page on the Bureau of Waterworks, Tokyo Metropolitan Government

Aqueducts in Japan
Edo